Chengdu Zoo is a station on Line 3 of the Chengdu Metro in China. It serves the nearby Chengdu Zoo and Zhaojue Temple.

Station layout

Gallery

References

Railway stations in Sichuan
Railway stations in China opened in 2016
Chengdu Metro stations